A grape is a fruit that grows on the vines of plants in the genus Vitis.

Grape or Grapes may also refer to:

Grapeshot, a kind of ballistic projectile
Grapes (surname)
Don Cherry (born 1934), Canadian retired hockey player and head coach and commentator, nicknamed "Grapes"
GRAPE, a computer programming environment
Gravity Pipe, a Tokyo University supercomputer (abbreviated GRAPE)
Groovy (programming language) Adaptable Packaging Engine, alternately called the Groovy Advanced Packaging Engine (GRAPE)
Grapes (film), a 2008 Czech film
Gray rape, sometimes shortened to "grape".
Grape Island (disambiguation)

See also
The Grapes (disambiguation)
Grape-kun, a Humboldt penguin who lived in a Japanese zoo